Don K. Haggar (born August 6, 1957) is an American politician and a former Republican member of the South Dakota House of Representatives representing District 10 since January 11, 2013. He is the father of Jenna Haggar, the other District 10 representative. He resigned on 27 June 2017 to become the leader of the South Dakota chapter of Americans for Prosperity.

Education
Haggar earned his MBA from the University of South Dakota.

Election history
2016     Haggar was re-elected with 5,484 votes; Steven Haugaard was re-elected with 5,838 and Paul Vanderline received 3,437 votes and Dean Kurtz received 3,283 votes.
2014     Haggar was re-elected with 3,774 votes;  Steven Haugaard was also elected with 3,574 votes; and Jo Hausman received 2,402 votes and James Wrigg received 1,769 votes.
2012     With District 10 incumbent Republican Representative Gene G. Abdallah running to return to the South Dakota Senate and Roger Hunt term limited and leaving both District 10 seats open, and incumbent Republican Representative Jenna Haggar redistricted from District 15, Haggar ran alongside his daughter in the three-way June 5, 2012 Republican Primary, where she placed first and he placed second with 457 votes (31.3%) ahead of former state Senator Dave Munson; in the four-way November 6, 2012 General election, she took the first seat and he took the second seat with 4,620 votes (27.37%) ahead of Democratic nominees Jo Hausman and Brian Parsons.

References

External links
Official page at the South Dakota Legislature
Campaign site
 

Place of birth missing (living people)
Living people
Republican Party members of the South Dakota House of Representatives
Politicians from Sioux Falls, South Dakota
University of South Dakota alumni
1957 births
21st-century American politicians